George Hope was the 24th head football coach for the University of Richmond Spiders located in Richmond, Virginia and he held that position for the 1945 season.  His career coaching record at Richmond was 2–6  His greatest game was a 40–0 victory over Guilford College on October 20, 1945.

Head coaching record

References

Year of birth missing
Year of death missing
Richmond Spiders football coaches
University of Richmond alumni
Sportspeople from Virginia Beach, Virginia